Bilan may refer to:

People
Dima Bilan (born 1981), Russian singer-songwriter
Ihor Bilan (born 1973), Ukrainian football player
Miro Bilan (born 1989), Croatian basketball player
Olena Bilan (born 1979), Ukrainian economist

Other
Bilan (magazine), a Swiss French-language business magazine
Biran, Iran, aka Birlan or Bīlān, a village in Bakeshluchay Rural District, in the Central District of Urmia County, West Azerbaijan Province, Iran
"Le Bilan", a 1980 song by French singer Jean Ferrat

See also